Water availability may refer to:
 the availability of global water resources
 water activity

Water